The Netherlands men's national squash team represents the Netherlands in international squash team competitions, and is governed by Dutch Squash Federation.

Since 1981, the Netherlands has participated in one quarter finals of the World Squash Team Open, in 2007.

Current team
 Laurens Jan Anjema
 Dylan Bennett
 Sebastiaan Weenink
 Bart Ravelli
 Marc Ter Sluis

Results

World Team Squash Championships

European Squash Team Championships

See also 
 Dutch Squash Federation
 World Team Squash Championships
 Netherlands women's national squash team

References 

Squash teams
Men's national squash teams
Squash
Men's sport in the Netherlands
Squash in the Netherlands